Homeyla (also Romanized as Ḩomeylā) is a village in Ahudasht Rural District, Shavur District, Shush County, Khuzestan Province, Iran. At the 2006 census, its population was 550, in 88 families.

References 

Populated places in Shush County